New Kingston Presbyterian Church is a historic Presbyterian church on CR 6 in New Kingston, Delaware County, New York, United States. It is a one-story, rectangular wood-frame building on a stone foundation built in 1900.  It features a steep gable roof with slate shingles and a broad raking cornice.  It also has a three-stage, engaged corner tower.

It was added to the National Register of Historic Places in 2002.

See also
National Register of Historic Places listings in Delaware County, New York

References

Presbyterian churches in New York (state)
Churches on the National Register of Historic Places in New York (state)
National Register of Historic Places in Delaware County, New York
Churches completed in 1900
Churches in Delaware County, New York
1900 establishments in New York (state)